Julia Simic (born 14 May 1989) is a German retired women's footballer. She has also played for several of Germany's youth teams as well as two games with the senior national team.

Career
Simic was born on 14 May 1989 in Fürth and is of German and Croatian descent. She signed a contract with Women's Bundesliga champion Wolfsburg, that began on 1 January 2015 and will end in 2017.

Simic was named to the senior national team's squad for the first 2013 Euro qualification stage match against Switzerland after Dzsenifer Marozsán got injured, but she suffered an ACL injury in her first training. She missed most of the 2011–12 season.

In 2018, she left Germany for the English side West Ham United. In August 2020, she joined Milan.

Honours
Bayern Munich
 DFB-Pokal: 2011–12
 Bundesliga Cup: 2011

1. FFC Turbine Potsdam
 DFB-Hallenpokal: 2014

VfL Wolfsburg
Bundesliga: 2016–17
 DFB-Pokal: 2014–15, 2015–16, 2016–17

West Ham United
 Women's FA Cup: Finalists 2018–19

Germany U19
 UEFA Women's Under-19 Championship: 2007

References

External links
 
Soccerway profile

1989 births
Living people
German people of Croatian descent
Sportspeople from Fürth
German women's footballers
Footballers from Bavaria
Women's association football midfielders
Germany women's international footballers
1. FFC Turbine Potsdam players
FC Bayern Munich (women) players
VfL Wolfsburg (women) players
Frauen-Bundesliga players
Women's Super League players
Serie A (women's football) players
West Ham United F.C. Women players
A.C. Milan Women players
German expatriate women's footballers
German expatriate sportspeople in England
Expatriate footballers in England
German expatriate sportspeople in Italy
Expatriate women's footballers in Italy